Nagamichi (written: 長礼, 長行 or 長訓) is a masculine Japanese given name. Notable people with the name include:

, Japanese daimyō
, Japanese ornithologist
, Japanese samurai

Japanese masculine given names